Tiznit or Tiznet is a town in the west coast of the Moroccan region of Souss-Massa, founded in 1881 by the Sultan Hassan I. It is the capital of Tiznit Province and recorded a population of 74,699 in the 2014 Moroccan census. Jewish silversmiths moved into the town and established its reputation as the center of gold and silver handicraft in Morocco.  Tiznit is well known for its silver jewelry, mint, daggers and sabres.

The province of Tiznit is in the western side of the Anti-Atlas. Tiznit, some 80 km south of Agadir, is a place full of Imazighn ( isoussin).

Historically speaking, Tiznit was the starting point of the famous dynasty of Almoravides who came to rule Morocco from Madrasa El Ouaggaguia in Aglou (a coastal village 14 km from Tiznit). The history of the city is also linked to the particular importance the Alawite Sultans granted to the city. Sultan Moulay Hassan I visited Tiznit twice, the first time in 1882 and the second time in 1886.

Among the monuments that characterize the city of Tiznit are Khalifa Palace, El Méchouar Place and the Grand Mosque. The old Medina of Tiznit is enclosed by a wall of five historic gates: Bab Aglou, Bab el Khemis, Bab Targa, Bab el Maader and Bab Oulad Jerrar. All of these gates are of Alawite tradition and strongly resemble those of the city of Essaouira.

Tiznit is the place of manufacture of the finest jewels of the South of Morocco. There are daggers, horse saddles, Fantasia rifles, anklets, pendants that women attach to their chests or foreheads all decorated with semi-precious stones and enamels.

What distinguishes the city of Tiznit is its dynamic civil society. There are more than 200 associations working in a number of areas, particularly development, education, culture, philanthropy, sport, and music; a fact which makes the city the center of a remarkable cultural radiation in the south of Morocco.

Also, Tiznit has a number of public facilities; there are five socio-cultural centers in the city, Mokhtar Soussi Multimedia Library, 10 sport fields for proximity, Almassira Stadium with good grass, Olympic Swimming Pool, Cinema Hall Bahia, road station, Museum of Heritage, Handicraft Complex, 4 rated hotels etc.

The city council of Tiznit is highly hailed by people for the efforts it invests to keep the city a tourist attraction.

International relations

Twin towns – Sister cities
Tiznit is twinned with:

  Somerville, Massachusetts, United States (2010)  
  Saint-Denis, France

In popular culture
 British blues rock singer Ramon Goose used Tiznit as his subject matter for the song "Long Road to Tiznit" from the album also called Long Road to Tiznit (World Music Network) inspired by his travels in the region.
 Swedish gothic metal band Tiamat has an instrumental track named "Tiznit" on their 2012 album The Scarred People.
 The character Ali in the 1974 film Ali: Fear Eats the Soul is from Tiznit.

References 

https://www.memphistours.com/Morocco/Morocco-Travel-Guide/Agadir-Travel-Guide/wiki/tiznit-city

External links 

 English version of Le Portail de la ville de Tiznit
 Tiznit entry in the Encyclopedia of the Orient
 Entry in Lexicorient

Populated places established in 1881
Populated places in Tiznit Province
Municipalities of Morocco
Tiznit
1881 establishments in Africa